Frank V. Webster was a pseudonym used by the Stratemeyer Syndicate. A total of 25 novels in The Webster Series For Boys were published by Cupples & Leon between 1909 and 1915. Titles were reprinted in 1938 by Saalfield Publishing.

Frank V. Webster name
Effort was made to present Webster as if he was a real person. A 1911 advertisement stated: "We have made a distinct find in Mr. Frank V. Webster, who is under contract to write exclusively for us." Part of a 1921 newspaper advertisement read: "Mr. Webster’s style is much like that of the late lamented Horatio Alger, Jr., but his tales are all up-to-date. These are clean, clever boys’ stories."

Actual authors
Many of the novels were written by Howard R. Garis. Other authors were George Rathbone, J. W. Lincoln and Weldon J. Cobb.

Bibliography

1. Only a Farm Boy (1909)
2. Tom the Telephone Boy (1909)
3. The Boy from the Ranch (1909)
4. The Young Treasure Hunter (1909)
5. Bob the Castaway (1909)
6. The Young Firemen of Lakeville (1909)
7. The Newsboy Partners (1909)
8. The Boy Pilot of the Lakes (1909)
9. Two Boy Gold Miners (1909)
10. Jack the Runaway (1909)
11. Comrades of the Saddle (1910)
12. The Boys of Bellwood School (1910)
13. Bob Chester’s Grit (1911)
 
14. Airship Andy (1911)
15. The High School Rivals (1911)
16. Darry the Life Saver (1911)
17. Dick the Bank Boy (1911)
18. Ben Hardy’s Flying Machine (1911)
19. The Boys of the Wireless (1912)
20. Harry Watson’s High School Days (1912)
21. The Boy Scouts of Lennox (1915)
22. Tom Taylor at West Point (1915)
23. Cowboy Dave (1915)
24. Two Boys of the Battleship (1915)
25. Jack of the Pony Express (1915)

References

External links
 
  
 

American children's writers
Stratemeyer Syndicate pseudonyms